Mata Gujri University is a private university located in Kishanganj, Bihar, India. The university was established by the Mata Gujri Memorial Medical College & L.S.K. Hospital Trust, and like all private universities in Bihar, it operates under the Bihar Private Universities Act, 2013, through Gazette notification. It is the affiliating university of the Mata Gujri Memorial Medical College & Lions Seva Kendra Hospital, approved by the Medical Council of India (MCI). It is named after Mata Gujri.

Constituent institutes 
The college is composed of the following constituent institutes:
 Mata Gujri Memorial Medical College & Lions Seva Kendra Hospital (MGMMC)
 Mata Gujri College of Pharmacy
 Mata Gujri College of Nursing
 Mata Gujri G.N.M Nursing School

References

External links
 

Kishanganj
Universities in Bihar
Private universities in India
2019 establishments in Bihar
Educational institutions established in 2019
Medical colleges in Bihar